The Gabriel Sundukyan State Academic Theatre, founded on February 25, 1922 in Yerevan, is the oldest modern theatre in Armenia.

Well-known actors and directors such as Vardan Ajemian, Vahram Papazian, Hrachia Ghaplanyan, Hrachia Nersisyan, Hasmik, Avet Avetisian, Varduhi Varderesyan, Arus Voskanian, and Edgar Elbakyan were the stars of the theater's group. They performed both national and foreign plays, such as Sundukyan's Testament, Muratsan's Rouzan, Shant's Ancient Gods, Camus's Caligula, Brecht's Resistible Rise of Arturo Ui, Chekhov's Cherry Orchard, O'Neill's Desire Under the Elms, Werfel's Forty Days of Musa Dagh, etc.

People's Artist of Armenia Armen Elbakyan is the Artistic Director of Sundukyan Theatre.

The theatre is named after Gabriel Sundukian, who founded the Armenian school of realistic drama.

References

External links
 Yerevan National Academic Theater after Sundukyan
 Theatre at Armeniapedia
 map

Theatres in Armenia
Armenian culture
Buildings and structures in Yerevan
Theatres completed in 1922